Al-Osmani Mosque is a mosque in Medan, North Sumatra, Indonesia. The mosque is also known as Labuhan mosque because of its location in the district of Medan Labuhan. The mosque is located on the K.L. Yos Sudarso road, subdistrict of Pekan Labuhan, about 20 kilometers north of the city of Medan. In front of this mosque there are a school, named YASPI School (Islamic Education Foundation) and not far from the mosque there are a Chinese temple named Pekong Lima and in front of the temple there is a path that leads to Labuhan market. The mosque is the oldest in the city of Medan.

Masjid Al-Osmani was built in 1854 by the 7th of Deli sultan, Sultan Osman Perkasa Alam by using wood material. Then in 1870 to 1872 the mosque which was made of wood was built to be permanent building by child of Sultan Osman, Sultan Mahmud Perkasa Alam who also became the 8th Sultan of Deli.

Up to now, apart from being used as a place of worship, the mosque was also used as a memorial and celebration of religious holidays and the place of departure to the lodgment of mecca pilgrims that coming from northern areas of Medan. In this mosque, there are five royal cemetery buried the Tuanku Panglima Pasutan (4th Sultan of Deli), Tuanku Panglima Gendar Wahid (5th Sultan of Deli), Sulthan Amaluddin Perkasa Alam (6th Sultan of Deli), Sultan Osman Perkasa Alam, and Sulthan Mahmud Perkasa Alam.

Architecture
When first built, the Al-Osmani mosque measured only 16 x 16 meters with the main material of wood. In 1870, Sultan Mahmud Al-Rashid Deli VIII had the mosque redesigned by Dutch architect GD Langereis. In addition to built a permanent basis, with material from Europe and Persia, also expanded its size to 26 x 26 meters. Renovation was completed in 1872.

Several restoration to the building of this mosque have been carried out without losing the original architecture of the building is a blend of Middle Eastern, Indian, Spanish, Malay, and Chinese.

The combination of the architecture based on the four countries, for example the Chinese styled ornate door of the mosque, the building carving nuanced by Indian, and European style architecture and ornaments nuanced with Middle East. The design is unique, stylish Indian with a copper dome octagonal. The domes are made from the brass weighing up to 2.5 tons

Masjid Al-Osmani predominantly yellow color, with a golden yellow color which is the color of the pride of the Malays, the colors are interpreted or show of pomp and glory. Then combined with the green color indicates Islamic philosophic.

References

External links

Al-Osmani Mosque Tour

Religious buildings and structures completed in 1854
Mosques in Medan
Tourist attractions in North Sumatra